Kai Bjorn (born 13 July 1968) is a Canadian sailor. He competed in the Star event at the 2000 Summer Olympics.

References

External links
 

1968 births
Living people
Canadian male sailors (sport)
Olympic sailors of Canada
Sailors at the 2000 Summer Olympics – Star
Sportspeople from Montreal